was a Japanese ukiyo-e artist of the Utagawa school.  He was originally from Aizu in Iwashiro Province and first worked in a dye shop after arriving in Edo (modern Tokyo).  It was there that he was noticed by Utagawa Toyokuni, to whom he became apprenticed.

Kunimasa is especially known for his yakusha-e portrait prints of kabuki actors, and for his bijin-ga pictures of beautiful women.  Richard Lane described his style as striving to "combine the intensity of Sharaku with the decorative pageantry of his master Toyokuni". Those who make such comparison often say he failed to achieve the level of Sharaku's intensity.

Notes

References
 Lane, Richard. (1978).  Images from the Floating World, The Japanese Print. Oxford: Oxford University Press. ;  OCLC 5246796
Morse, Anne Nishimura (1985). "Utagawa Kunimasa". Kodansha Encyclopedia of Japan. Tokyo: Kodansha Ltd.

External links
British Museum: Utagawa Kunimasa, The actor Ichikawa Ebizō in a shibaraku role, a colour woodblock print
Art site

1773 births
1810 deaths
Ukiyo-e artists
Utagawa school